Nesthy Alcayde Petecio (born April 11, 1992) is a Filipino amateur boxer. She won a silver medal in the inaugural women's featherweight event at the 2020 Summer Olympics, becoming the first Filipino woman to win an Olympic medal in boxing. She also won a silver medal at the 2014 World Championships and gold at the 2019 edition.

Early life and education
Nesthy Petecio was born in Santa Cruz, Davao del Sur to parents Teodoro and Prescilla Petecio. Petecio came from a poor family; her father was a farmer while her mother is a housewife. At a young age, Nesthy and her siblings had to aid their parents in the farm to earn a living. She recalled selling manure as fertilizer just to earn money. According to Petecio, boxing paved way for her to be able to attend college in Rizal Technological University in spite of financial problems and considers it her "way out of poverty."

Amateur career

Early years
Nesthy Petecio and her siblings were taught boxing as a means of self-defense. Petecio and her siblings went on to join inter-barangay boxing competitions to help their family financially.

Petecio had a big break in her boxing career at age 11, when she joined a boxing match at the Araw ng Davao in Rizal Park, Davao City. Although competitions were usually arranged by gender, Petecio's opponent was male with a bigger build and more experience than herself. However she was able to win the match, which drew the attention of Celestino Rebamonte who in turn endorsed her to the Philippine women's team coach Roel Velasco. She was then able to compete at the 2007 Smart National Youth and Women’s Open Boxing Championships in Cagayan de Oro where she won gold. As a result she earned her a berth in the national boxing team.

National team
Representing the Philippines, Petecio went on to compete in several international competitions. She clinched silver medals at the 2014 AIBA Women's World Championships and the 2011 and 2013 Southeast Asian Games; a bronze medal in the 2012 Asian Championships; and a gold medal in the 2015 Indonesia President’s Cup

She would also compete in the 2014 Asian Games in Incheon, South Korea, the 2015 and 2017 Asian Championships but fail to make a podium finish. She also failed to qualify for the 2016 Summer Olympics in Rio de Janeiro, Brazil. Failing to medal at the 2018 Asian Games in Jakarta, Indonesia and dealing with the aftermath of ending a relationship with a girlfriend, Petecio experienced a bout of depression.

After a break, Petecio made a comeback by winning a gold at the 2019 Thailand Open International Boxing Championship. At the 2019 AIBA Women's World Boxing Championships in Ulan-Ude, Petecio won gold in the featherweight division after defeating hometown bet Liudmila Vorontsova in the final. She ended the year with another gold medal, this time at the 2019 Southeast Asian Games. It was a sweet victory for Petecio after failing to bring home the top prize in the biennial meet in her three previous attempts.

Petecio was able to qualify for the 2020 Summer Olympics in Tokyo, Japan due to her high ranking, after the world qualifiers was cancelled due to the COVID-19 pandemic. Competing in the women's featherweight event, Petecio's first fight was a 5:0 victory against Marcelat Sakobi Matshu of the Democratic Republic of Congo. In her next bout Petecio defeated Lin Yu-ting of Chinese Taipei (3:2) to advance to the quarterfinals, where she defeated Yeni Arias of Columbia (5:0) to secure at least a bronze medal and become the first woman to win a medal in Olympic boxing. She then defeated Irma Testa of Italy (4:1) in the semifinals to secure her place in the gold medal bout. Facing her amateur rival Sena Irie in the final, Petecio lost by unanimous decision (0:5) to take home the silver medal, the first Olympic boxing medal won by a Filipino boxer in 25 years.

Results

2015 World Championships results
 Defeated Manel Meharzi (Algeria) PTS (3–0)
 Defeated Maryna Malovana (Ukraine) PTS (3–0)
 Defeated Lu Qiong (China) PTS (3–0)
 Defeated Tiara Brown (United States) PTS (3–0)
 Lost to Zinaida Dobrynina (Russia) PTS (0–2)

2014 Asian Games results
 Defeated Gulzhaina Ubbiniyazova (Kazakhstan) PTS (3–0)
 Loss to Yin Junhua (China) PTS (0–3)

2019 World Championships results
 Defeated Jucielen Romeu (Brazil) PTS (3–2)
 Defeated Stanimira Petrova (Bulgaria) PTS (3–2)
 Defeated Qiao Jieru (China) PTS (3–2)
 Defeated Sena Irie (Japan) PTS (4–1)
 Defeated Karriss Artingstall (England) PTS (4–1)
 Defeated Liudmila Vorontsova (Russia) PTS (3–2)

2020 Summer Olympics results
 Defeated Marcelat Sakobi Matshu (Congo) PTS (5–0)
 Defeated Lin Yu-ting (Chinese-Taipei) PTS (3–2)
 Defeated Yeni Arias (Colombia) PTS (5–0)
 Defeated Irma Testa (Italy) PTS (4–1)
 Loss to  Sena Irie (Japan) PTS (5–0)

Personal life
Nesthy Petecio openly identifies as a lesbian. She dedicated her Olympic silver medal to the LGBTQ community.

In popular media
In 2021, Petecio made a virtual appearance in Pinoy Big Brother: Kumunity Season 10 when she gave a message to the Celebrity housemates, and declaring the Pinoy Big Brother Games 2021 open.

References

1992 births
Living people
Filipino women boxers
Boxers at the 2014 Asian Games
Boxers from Davao del Sur
AIBA Women's World Boxing Championships medalists
Rizal Technological University alumni
Southeast Asian Games medalists in boxing
Southeast Asian Games silver medalists for the Philippines
Boxers at the 2018 Asian Games
Competitors at the 2011 Southeast Asian Games
Competitors at the 2013 Southeast Asian Games
Competitors at the 2015 Southeast Asian Games
Asian Games competitors for the Philippines
World featherweight boxing champions
Southeast Asian Games gold medalists for the Philippines
Competitors at the 2019 Southeast Asian Games
Boxers at the 2020 Summer Olympics
Olympic boxers of the Philippines
Medalists at the 2020 Summer Olympics
Olympic silver medalists for the Philippines
Olympic medalists in boxing
LGBT boxers
Filipino LGBT sportspeople
Filipino lesbians
Southeast Asian Games bronze medalists for the Philippines
Competitors at the 2021 Southeast Asian Games